Kate Hall may refer to:

Kate Hall (athlete) (born 1997), American track and field athlete
Kate Hall (curator) (1861–1918), English museum curator
Kate Hall (soap opera writer), American writer
Kate Hall (singer) (born 1983), Danish-English singer

See also
Katie Hall (disambiguation)